IPDA may refer to:
 Isophorone diamine, a chemical compound
 International Public Debate Association,  a US national debate league
 International Planetary Data Alliance, a planetary research data organization
 Internet Philatelic Dealers Association, an association of internet stamp dealers